Radu was, according to Ion Mihai Pacepa, a radiological weapon used against dissenters and critics by Nicolae Ceaușescu's Securitate. "Radu" is a Romanian name and in this context it is a reference to "radiation". The supposed weapon was intended to lead to cancer which would result in death within months after the exposure.

According to Pacepa, it was created by the Securitate's "Service K" in spring 1970, using radioactive materials it received from the KGB. The Romanian "Service K", founded in 1950s by the Soviets using the KGB model, was in charge of the dirty work against jailed prisoners who they considered dangerous to the regime. This included monitoring them with microphones and trying to frame them by inducing them into making incriminating statements. The same Pacepa claimed the service was also in charge of killing those prisoners and making it appear like a suicide or natural death.

Historian Mihai Pelin claimed in a book on Radio Free Europe, Melița și Eterul, that there was no such weapon, but others, such as RFE journalist Nestor Ratesh, argue that Pelin also claimed the Securitate was not involved in the 1981 RFE bombing, a position that was allegedly contradicted by Romanian president Ion Iliescu.

References

Socialist Republic of Romania
Nuclear terrorism
Weapons of Romania
Radiological weapons
Romanian inventions